The Seven Sorrows Polyptych is an oil on panel painting by Albrecht Dürer. The painting includes a central picture (108 x 43 cm), currently at the Alte Pinakothek in Munich, and seven surrounding panels (measuring some 60 x 46 cm) which are exhibited at the Gemäldegalerie Alte Meister of Dresden.

Description
The work was commissioned by Frederick III, Elector of Saxony, not a long time after his meeting with Dürer at Nuremberg in April 1496. Stylistic considerations suggest that the artist started to work on the painting only from around 1500.

Modern scholars tend to attribute to  Dürer only the central panel, the others having been executed by his pupils based on his drawings. The central panel, portraying the Sorrowing Mother, arrived in the Bavarian museum from the   Benediktbeuren convent of Munich in the early 19th century. It was restored in the 1930s: once the overpaintings and additions were removed, the shell-shaped niche (a motif typical of Italian art), the halo and the sword (a symbol of Mary of the Seven Sorrows) on the right were rediscovered, clarifying the subject of the work.

The other panels were at Wittenberg, seat of Frederick's castle. In 1640 they were moved to the  Kunstkammer of the Prince of Saxony. In the mid-20th century they were restored: their conditions improved, but the attribution was not cleared.

References

Further reading
K. Niehr, ‘Dürer’s Bild der Sieben Schmerzen Mariens und die Bedeutung der retrospektiven Form‘, in: Marburger Jahrbuch für Kunstwissenschaft, vol. 36, (2009), pp. 117 – 143.

External links

Paintings by Albrecht Dürer
1500s paintings
Collections of the Gemäldegalerie Alte Meister
Collection of the Alte Pinakothek
Paintings depicting the Crucifixion of Jesus
Paintings depicting the Flight into Egypt
Books in art
Donkeys in art